The 1893 Epsom Derby was a horse race which took place at Epsom Downs on 31 May 1893. It was the 113th running of the Derby, and it was won by Isinglass. The winner was ridden by Tommy Loates and trained by James Jewitt.

Race details
 Prize money: £6,000 (Winner received £5,000)
 Number of runners: 11
 Winner's time: 2m 43s

Full result

* The distances between the horses are shown in lengths or shorter. shd = short-head; hd = head; PU = pulled up; UR = unseated rider.

Winner's details
Further details of the winner, Isinglass:

 Foaled: 1890
 Sire: Isonomy; Dam: Dead Lock (Wenlock)
 Owner: Harry McCalmont
 Breeder: Harry McCalmont

References
 Race Report - Otago Witness

Epsom Derby
 1893
Epsom Derby
Epsom Derby
19th century in Surrey